John Howard Walker known as Jack Walker,  was a male athlete who competed for England.

Athletics career
He competed for England in the pole vault at the 1934 British Empire Games in London.

Walker represented Port Sunlight Athletic Club and Oxford University.

References

English male pole vaulters
Athletes (track and field) at the 1934 British Empire Games
Commonwealth Games competitors for England